Beloit College is a private liberal arts college in Beloit, Wisconsin. Founded in 1846, when Wisconsin was still a territory, it is the state's oldest continuously operated college. It is a member of the Associated Colleges of the Midwest and has an enrollment of roughly 1,400 undergraduate students.

History
Beloit College was founded by the group Friends for Education, which was started by seven pioneers from New England who, soon after their arrival in the Wisconsin Territory, agreed that a college needed to be established. The group raised funds for a college in their town and convinced the territorial legislature to enact the charter for Beloit College on February 2, 1846. The first building (then called Middle College) was built in 1847, and remains in operation. Classes began in the fall of 1847, with the first degrees awarded in 1851.

Beloit's first president was a Yale University graduate, Aaron Lucius Chapin, who served from 1849 to 1886.

The college became coeducational in 1895. In 1904, Grace Ousley became the first African-American woman to graduate from the college.

Although independent today, Beloit College was historically, though unofficially, associated with Congregationalism.

The college remained very small for almost its entire first century, with enrollment topping 1,000 students only with the influx of World War II veterans in 1945–46. The "Beloit Plan" was a year-round curriculum introduced in 1964 that comprised three full terms and a "field term" of off-campus study. The trustees returned to the two-semester program in 1978.

The college experienced an unanticipated $7 million budget shortfall during the 2018–19 academic year. Lower than anticipated freshman enrollment and retention of rising sophomores was blamed. In response the college made several changes, including laying off faculty and staff and reducing salaries.

Campus
Beloit's campus is within the Near East Side Historic District.

The campus has 20 conical, linear, and animal effigy mounds built between about 400 and 1200, created by Native Americans identified by archaeologists as Late Woodland people. One of the mounds, in the shape of a turtle, inspired Beloit's symbol and official mascot. The mounds on Beloit's campus are "catalogued" burial sites, and therefore may not be disturbed without a Wisconsin Historical Society permit. Several of the Beloit College sites have been partially excavated and restored, and material found within them—including pottery and tool fragments—is held in the college's Logan Museum of Anthropology.

In 2008 Beloit College completed a  Center for the Sciences, which was named the Marjorie and James Sanger Center for the Sciences in 2017. The building was awarded LEED (Leadership in Energy and Environmental Design) green building certification. It also won a Design Excellence Honor Award in Interior Architecture from the Chicago chapter of the American Institute of Architects (AIA) in 2009.

In 2010, Beloit College opened the Hendricks Center for the Arts, a  structure with dance, music, and theater facilities. The building previously held the Beloit Post Office and later the Beloit Public Library. The renovation and expansion of the facility is the largest single gift in the college's history. The building is named after Diane Hendricks, chair of ABC Supply of Beloit, and her late husband and former college trustee Ken Hendricks.

In 2019 Beloit College started the construction on its newest building project, the renovation and resurrection of the Blackhawk Generating Station. The project was finished in 2020, and the building serves as the college's recreation center. 

Two Beloit campus museums open to the public are run by college staff and students. The Logan Museum of Anthropology and the Wright Museum of Art were founded in the late 19th century. The Logan Museum, accredited by the American Alliance of Museums, curates over 300,000 ethnographic and archaeological objects from 125 countries and over 600 cultural groups. The Wright Museum's holdings of over 8,000 objects include a large collection of original prints and Asian art.  Both museums feature temporary special exhibitions year-round. 

The Beloit College campus also houses two sculptures by artist Siah Armajani, Gazebo for One Anarchist: Emma Goldman 1991 and The Beloit College Poetry Garden.

Academics
Beloit College's curriculum retains many aspects of the Beloit Plan from the 1960s, emphasizing experiential learning, learner agency, and reflective connection-making between out-of-classroom and in-classroom learning experiences, or "the liberal arts in practice." Academic strengths include field-oriented disciplines such as anthropology and geology. More Beloit graduates have earned Ph.D.s in anthropology than graduates of any other undergraduate liberal arts college not affiliated with a university, and the school ranks among the top 20 American liberal arts colleges whose graduates go on to earn a Ph.D.

The geology department continues a tradition that began with T. C. Chamberlin more than a century ago. It combines a course load with field methods and research. The department is a member of the Keck Geology Consortium, a research collaboration of several similar colleges across the United States, including Amherst College, Pomona College, and Washington and Lee University. The Consortium sends undergraduate students worldwide to research and publish their findings.

The college created a center for entrepreneurship known as CELEB, founded by Professor of Economics Emeritus Jerry Gustafson (Beloit '63).

Beloit hosts seven annual academic residencies that bring leaders in their respective fields to work with students and serve as the center of other themed activities. The oldest is the Lois and Willard Mackey Chair in Creative Writing, established in the late 1980s, which has brought Denise Levertov, Scott Russell Sanders, Ursula Le Guin, and other noted writers. As part of the Weissberg Program in Human Rights, Beloit hosts the Weissberg Distinguished Professor in Human Rights and Social Justice, held by a person with significant international human rights experience. Weissberg Chairs have included Palestinian activist and scholar Hanan Ashrawi and U.S. Marine Corps General Anthony Zinni. The Upton Scholar presides over Beloit's major residency program in economics, which includes the Upton Forum on the Wealth and Well-Being of Nations. The Ousley Scholar in Residence hosts a junior scholar committed to social justice work and honors Grace Ousley, Beloit's first black woman graduate. The Crom Visiting Philosopher brings an influential philosopher to Beloit each year. Two residencies host visual and performing artists: the Ginsberg Family Artist-in-Residence program and the Victor E. Ferrall, Jr. Endowed Artist-in-Residence program, the latter named for the college's ninth president.

Beloit College's average class size is 15 students, with one-third of courses having 10 or fewer students. Its most popular majors, by 2021 graduates, were:
Biology/Biological Sciences (20)
Psychology (18)
Business/Managerial Economics (16)
History (13)
Chemistry (13)
Anthropology (13)

Student life
Beloit students' housing options range from substance-free dormitories to special interest houses, such as the Art, Spanish, Outdoor Environmental Club (OEC), and interfaith options. Beloit College has these fraternities and sororities: Phi Kappa Psi, Sigma Chi, and Tau Kappa Epsilon, national fraternities; Kappa Delta and Alpha Sigma Tau, national sororities; and Theta Pi Gamma, a local sorority. The school also has over 60 student organizations and clubs, which bring visitors (musicians, artists, poets) to campus. While Beloit adheres to Wisconsin state law, which states that the legal drinking age is 21, strict no-alcohol policies found on many other college campuses are not present at Beloit. Resident assistants, employed by the Residential Life office, help maintain campus safety and encourage responsible behavior.

The student newspaper, The Round Table, was founded in 1853 as the Beloit Monthly. Printed weekly, it provides news coverage, feature stories, and an art section. The student radio station, WBCR-FM, operates at 88.3 MHz and streams online.

Beloit College has a frisbee golf course contained almost entirely within the college grounds. In April 2006, Beloit students broke the world record for the longest game of Ultimate Frisbee, playing for over 72 hours.

In 2011 Beloit College received the Senator Paul Simon Award for Comprehensive Campus Internationalization. 48 states are represented at the college and approximately 14% of the student body is from countries outside the United States. In addition, about half of all Beloit College students study abroad in places such as China, Russia, Brazil, Germany, India, and Spain. Each year, students can share their experiences abroad on International Symposium Day, when all classes are canceled so that everyone can attend the presentations.

The "Mindset List", an annual list of the life experiences of entering college freshmen, originated at Beloit College in 1998. In 2019, the list moved to Marist College.

In 1969, like many campuses across the country, Beloit College received a set of demands from Black students called "The Black Demands". Various students protested by overtaking Middle College, turning it into a Black Cultural Center, and gathering in front of the Richardson Auditorium before a scheduled board of trustees meeting. The demands were met but the college has not successfully implemented all of them, such as increasing the percentage of both black faculty and students to 10%. In 2018 Beloit College edited its bias policy to add a section on hate acts in order to address hate acts that occurred in 2006, 2015 and 2017.

Athletics
Beloit competes at the NCAA Division III level as a member of the Midwest Conference and fields varsity teams in football, baseball, softball, volleyball, men's and women's swimming, men's and women's basketball, men's and women's cross country, women's tennis, men's and women's track and field, men's and women's lacrosse, and men's and women's soccer.

Recognition
As of 2019, Beloit was ranked #68 among national liberal arts colleges by U.S. News & World Report and #38 by Washington Monthly.

Beloit was included in Loren Pope's book Colleges That Change Lives, which distinguishes schools having two essential elements: "A familial sense of communal enterprise that gets students heavily involved in cooperative rather than competitive learning, and a faculty of scholars devoted to helping young people develop their powers, mentors who often become their valued friends". Pope added, "What Beloit turns out is a better, more effective person, and one who tends to go on getting better … [Beloit] outproduces very selective schools in graduates who make significant contributions and achievements."

Notable alumni

 Matthew Aid, military historian and author
 Roy Chapman Andrews, naturalist, explorer, and director of the American Museum of Natural History
 James Arness, actor, star of films and long-running TV series Gunsmoke
 Don Bolles, investigative journalist
 Thomas Chrowder Chamberlin, geologist, professor, University of Wisconsin president, museum director
 Derek Carrier, former NFL tight end 
 Jay Norwood "Ding" Darling, editorial cartoonist and conservationist who won two Pulitzer Prizes.
 Joe Davis, sportscaster
 Clarence Ellis, first African-American Ph.D. in computer science, pioneer in interface design
Janine P. Geske, justice of the Wisconsin Supreme Court
Zainab al-Khawaja, human rights activist
Stephanie Klett broadcast personality
 Courtney Lyder, nursing educator
 Kerwin Mathews, actor
 Judith A. Miller, attorney and government official, member of the Beloit Board of Trustees
 Lorine Niedecker, poet
Madeleine Roux, horror writer
 John Sall, one of the four founders of SAS Institute
Walter A. Strong, publisher Chicago Daily News
Matt Tolmach, filmmaker, Sony Pictures Entertainment executive
 James Zwerg, civil rights activist

Notable faculty

 Bei Dao, poet
 Jackson J. Bushnell, educator
 Thomas Chrowder Chamberlin, founder of the Journal of Geology
 Arthur M. Chickering, arachnologist
 Merle Curti, Pulitzer Prize recipient
 Robert O. Fink, papyrologist
 Crawford Gates, musician
 George Ellery Hale, astronomer
 Edward Hoagland, author
 Ursula K. Le Guin, author
 Henry Bradford Nason, chemist
 Lou B. ("Bink") Noll, poet
 John Ostrom, paleontologist
 Scott Sanders, author
 Erastus G. Smith, chemist and politician
 Robley Wilson, poet

See also
Thompson Observatory

References

External links

 Official website

 
Buildings and structures in Beloit, Wisconsin
Education in Rock County, Wisconsin
Educational institutions established in 1846
Liberal arts colleges in Wisconsin
Private universities and colleges in Wisconsin
1846 establishments in Wisconsin Territory